The following table shows regularly-scheduled United States Senate elections by region. The table does not include appointments or special elections.

Legend

Northeast

South

Midwest

West

See also
List of United States presidential election results by state
Party divisions of United States Congresses
List of special elections to the United States Senate

References

Notes